St. Norbert College (SNC) is a private Norbertine liberal arts college in De Pere, Wisconsin. Founded in October 1898 by Abbot Bernard Pennings, a Norbertine priest and educator, the school was named after Saint Norbert of Xanten. In 1952, the college became coeducational. , the school's enrollment is 1,939 students.

History

St. Norbert College was established when Abbot Bernard Pennings, a Dutch immigrant priest from the Premonstratensian Berne Abbey of Heeswijk, the Netherlands, founded the college to train young men for the priesthood. Francis Ignatius Van Dyke, a seminarian, was the first and, at the time, the only student. St. Norbert is the first and only institution of higher learning in the world sponsored by the Premonstratensian order. Abbot Pennings later started a commerce program at the college for lay students before retiring in 1955.

St. Norbert's second president, the Rev. Dennis Burke, expanded the college, anticipating the student population would eventually reach 2,000. Robert Christin, who became president in 1968, implemented the current course system and the academic divisional structure. In 1973, Neil Webb, a former faculty member and vice president, became president. Webb established the first permanent endowment for the school. Serving as the college's president from 1983 to 2000, Thomas Manion led the expansion of facilities and the development of additional academic programs. Enrollment topped 2,000. Thomas Kunkel, former dean of the Philip Merrill College of Journalism at the University of Maryland, College Park, became the seventh president of the college in 2008. Since then, the college has constructed the Mulva Family Fitness & Sports Center, the Gehl-Mulva Science Center, the Cassandra Voss Center, Michels Commons, Schneider Stadium, the Mulva Library, Gries Hall, Ariens Family Welcome Center and Todd Wehr Hall.

Brian J. Bruess, a 1990 graduate of St. Norbert College and former executive vice president and chief operating officer of St. Catherine University in St. Paul, Minnesota, became president in 2017. Although he announced on November 1, 2019, that he would not continue in his position as president after the end of the 2019–2020 academic year, uproar from the college community led to further discussion between Bruess and the SNC Board of Trustees that resulted in a multiyear contract. Four members of the board, including the chair, resigned shortly thereafter. In March 2022, Bruess announced his appointment as the inaugural president of the College of Saint Benedict and Saint John's University, beginning in July 2022. Kunkel, who served as president from 2008 to 2017, will serve as interim president of St. Norbert College, beginning in July 2022, while the college searches for its ninth president.

Academics

St. Norbert College offers undergraduate programs in more than 80 areas of study, leading to a Bachelor of Arts, Bachelor of Science, Bachelor of Music, or Bachelor of Business Administration degree. A Bachelor of Science in Nursing degree is also offered through a joint effort with the Bellin College of Nursing. The most popular undergraduate majors are Business Administration, Biology and Education. In addition to its undergraduate offerings, St. Norbert College offers three master's-level graduate programs in business administration, theological studies and liberal studies. The Master of Theological Studies department hosts a branch program in Albuquerque, New Mexico, where program studies take place at the Norbertine Abbey of Santa Maria de la Vid. Students on that campus can earn the full M.T.S. degree. In the fall of 2015, the college began offering an MBA program through its new Donald J. Schneider School of Business & Economics. The Medical College of Wisconsin's Green Bay campus, which serves the northeast Wisconsin region, is located in the new Gehl-Mulva Science Center at St. Norbert.

In 2022, St. Norbert was ranked 117th among "National Liberal Arts Colleges" by U.S. News & World Report. The college is also ranked 118th among "Liberal Arts Universities" in Forbes's 2019 list of America's Best Colleges.

The Mulva Library provides digital and in-person reference services; hosts the Digital Commons, an institutional repository of documents, media, and other materials online; and provides a makerspace with technologies for the academic community. It is the home of the Center for Norbertine Studies, the international center of research on the Premonstratensians and Norbertines. The library also holds the college archives and the college's café (Ed's Café).

Campus

As a residential campus, students typically walk to classes year-round. The many trees and statues on campus provide a scenic view, especially in fall, when the foliage changes colors. Directly behind the Campus Center is a pavilion and marina where St. Norbert hosts a picnic for students to kick off the school year. This shoreline area is also the venue for "Knights on the Fox" – a free summer concert series open to the community.       

Important social buildings include the Ray Van Den Heuvel Family Campus Center (Campus Center), which includes a fitness center, gymnasium, and diner (Phil's Diner) and a reading lounge with a picturesque view overlooking the Fox River. There is also an events hall for movies and public speakers. Special events put on by student groups are also held there, such as comedian appearances and awareness speeches.

Old St. Joseph Church, which is still an active church, was built in 1890 and renovated in 1998. It is located on the site of a former mission chapel that was erected for early settlers by the French-born Jesuit priest Rev. Charles Albane in 1676. The chapel stood for nearly 200 years. An all-wood structure was built in 1870, but it burned to the ground after a lightning strike in 1889. It was rebuilt in its current form as a brick structure in 1890. The church contains a statue/shrine of Saint Joseph that was crowned by Pope Leo XIII in 1891. Novena devotions are held on Wednesday.

The old St. Boniface Church (built in 1883) is owned by St. Norbert College. In 2013, it was renamed Dudley Birder Hall in honor of longtime St. Norbert College music professor, Dudley Birder. It was also converted into a performance arts center following a $1.7 million renovation. It is now used for recitals, chamber concerts, Dudley Birder Chorale rehearsals, and public lectures.

Much of the campus is located in what is now the St. Norbert College Historic District.

Student life

Student housing
About 86% of students live on campus in residence halls, apartments and townhouses. St. Norbert requires all traditional undergraduate students not registered as commuters to live on campus. Freshman housing includes three traditional residence hall options: Madelaine-Lorraine Hall (co-ed), Sensenbrenner Hall (Co-ed), and Bergstrom Hall (co-ed Honors students). Campus housing options for sophomores include Mary Minahan McCormick Hall, Michels Hall, and Victor McCormick Hall. Upperclassmen enjoy single-person dorm rooms such as Burke Hall, the Townhouses and Carriage House (apartment-like housing), college-owned houses and college-owned apartments, including Gries, Xanten and Prémontré Halls.

Student involvement
There are more than 100 registered student clubs and organizations on campus. St. Norbert encourages its students to become involved in their community through community service and by participating in one of the 15 fraternities, sororities, and independent social groups. The school also has eight National Honor Society chapters, two student publications, and eight musical and performance ensembles. A major activity that St. Norbert students participate in is the annual "Into The Streets" community service project that provides service to organizations in De Pere and neighboring communities. This event is staffed by first-year students, staff and faculty, and is part of the First-Year Experience program.

In 2013, the old St. John’s Lutheran Church (originally built in 1932) was reopened as the Cassandra Voss Center following a $2.7 million renovation. It was named after former St. Norbert College student Cassandra Voss, who tragically died in a car accident at age 21. Before her death, she was on track to become St. Norbert College’s first student to graduate with a major in women’s and gender studies. The building now features offices, study space, performance space, a kitchen, a classroom, and a library. The Cassandra Voss Center offers a variety of programs “exploring intersectional issues of identity and inclusion” and “fostering dialogue on topics related to justice and identity including racism, sexism, homophobia, and classism”.

Greek life
Greek life at St. Norbert includes four sororities and three fraternities, as well as two Greek governing groups. Greek groups sponsor fund-raising activities, food drives, and benefits to support charities. Greek groups collectively completed a total of 2,117 hours of service and raised $9,638 for their respective philanthropies during the 2015–2016 school year.

Fraternities
There are three fraternities on the St. Norbert campus: Kappa Sigma (ΚΣ), Phi Delta Theta (ΦΔΘ), and Tau Kappa Epsilon (ΤΚΕ).

Sororities
There are four sororities on the St. Norbert campus: Alpha Xi Delta (ΑΞΔ), Delta Phi Epsilon (ΔΦΕ), Kappa Beta Gamma (ΚΒΓ), and Theta Phi Alpha (ΘΦΑ).

Athletics

The St. Norbert College Green Knights participate in NCAA Division III athletics and were members of the Midwest Conference from 1982 through the 2020–2021 season. In Fall 2021, they joined the Northern Athletic Collegiate Conference. St. Norbert offers 23 varsity sports including: football, men's and women's volleyball, men's and women's soccer, men's and women's golf, men's and women's tennis, men's and women's cross country, men's and women's basketball, men's and women's hockey, men's and women's swimming and diving, softball, baseball, men's and women's track and field, cheerleading, and dance. 

The Green Knights men's hockey team has appeared in 19 NCAA Division III Tournaments since 1997. The team has 12 Frozen Four appearances and won the national championship in 2008, 2011, 2012, 2014 and 2018, while placing as national runner-up in 2004, 2006, 2010 and 2016.

The Green Knights football team has won 17 Midwest Conference championships since joining the league in 1984.

The Green Bay Packers have conducted training camp on the St. Norbert campus since 1958, making this the NFL's longest training camp relationship between a team and school. In exchange, the Packers donate their used equipment and provide St. Norbert yearly grants.

Notable alumni

 Chris Ayers, Hollywood cartoonist
 Nicholas J. Bichler, Wisconsin State Assemblyman (1935–42, 1951–52)
 Vernon Biever, photographer and author
 William W. Brash III, Wisconsin Court of Appeals judge
 Robert John Cornell, member of the United States House of Representatives from Wisconsin (1975–79)
 N. Patrick Crooks, Wisconsin Supreme Court justice (1996-2015)
 William J. Duffy, Wisconsin jurist and legislator
 Tom Durkin, sportscaster
 James H. Flatley, U.S. Navy vice admiral
 Lawrence J. Fleming, U.S. Air Force Major General
 Ted Fritsch, Jr., football player
 Chester A. Gerlach, Wisconsin State Assemblyman (1972)
 Herbert J. Grover, educator and politician
 John C. Hanley, U.S. Army general
 David E. Hutchison, Wisconsin State Assemblyman (1994-2001)
 Larry Krause, NFL player
 Joe LaFleur, NFL player
 Jill Lannan, Air National Guard Brigadier General
 Myron P. Lotto, Wisconsin State Senator (1969–73)
 Dale McKenna, Wisconsin State Senator (1969)
 Terry Meeuwsen, television host and Miss America 1973
 Milo, rapper
 Michael Monfils, mayor, City of Green Bay (1975–79)
 William R. Moser, politician and jurist
 Mary Mullarkey, Chief Justice of the Colorado Supreme Court
 Leo P. O'Brien, Wisconsin State Senator (1953–64)
 Tip O'Neill, NFL player
 Paul J. Rogan, Wisconsin State Assemblyman (1948, 50) and Senator (1952, 54)
 James J. Schmitt, mayor, City of Green Bay (2003-2019)
 Matt Sloan, film director and comedian, co-creator of Chad Vader
Andrew H. Van de Ven Scholar, co-developer of the Nominal Group Technique
 Tadashi Yamamoto, founder of the Japan Center for International Exchange and the Shimoda Conference

References

External links

 Official website

 
Educational institutions established in 1898
Education in Brown County, Wisconsin
Buildings and structures in Brown County, Wisconsin
Catholic universities and colleges in Wisconsin
Premonstratensian Order
Roman Catholic Diocese of Green Bay
Association of Catholic Colleges and Universities
De Pere, Wisconsin
1898 establishments in Wisconsin